The Tucson Symphony Orchestra, or TSO, is the primary professional orchestra of Tucson, Arizona.  Founded in 1928, when the season consisted of just two concerts, the TSO is the oldest continuously running performing arts organization in the Southwest.  The TSO's season now runs from September to May and consists of over 60 concerts, including a Classics Series of eight programs, a Pops Series of four programs, a Masterworks series of five chamber orchestra programs, a number of one-night only specials, and run-out concerts to  surrounding areas, such as Oro Valley, Green Valley, Bisbee, Safford, Thatcher, and Nogales.  The TSO also provides educational programming that reaches over 40,000 school children each season.  Within the TSO are a number of standing chamber ensembles, including a string quartet, string quintet, piano trio, harp trio, brass quintet, and woodwind quintet. These ensembles help provide educational programming through school visits, perform recitals annually, and also perform at private and community events.

The TSO performs music of a variety of styles, including classical, big-band, folk, jazz, pop, mariachi, and also commissions and performs new works by living composers.

History of the TSO
The Orchestra's first performance, on January 13, 1929, took place in the Tucson High School Auditorium under its first conductor, Tucsonan Camil Van Hulse. The Orchestra played Schubert's Rosamunde Overture and Beethoven's Symphony No. 7. Local papers hailed the debut as a monumental achievement and said the audience greeted the Symphony's performance with "surprise, admiration and bursts of enthusiasm."

Though there were only two concerts the first season, the second offered three concerts and featured a new conductor, Joseph De Luca, who remained with the Symphony for five years. Concerts were held on Sunday evenings at 8:30. The early concert programs were all-orchestral; on March 16, 1930, soprano Mary Margaret Fischer appeared as the orchestra's first soloist. Midway through the third season, the TSO moved to the Temple of Music and Art, first playing there on January 25, 1931.

1935 was a year of dramatic change. Up to that point, funds were meager and obtained through ticket sales ($5 for a season) and the fundraising. Even the daily paper observed that “against many odds the symphony came through the year sans debt—but it managed on a starvation diet as to musical library and many other details. ” The Tucson Symphony Society's board of directors soon agreed, in a controversial decision, to allow the orchestra to come under the aegis of the University of Arizona. The brief and stormy union of the university and orchestra allowed growth through student players, financial aid, scores and instruments. TSO regained its independence at year's end.

1950 – 1971
In 1950 when players learned that Music Director and Conductor Samuel Fain was being paid $200 a season for his efforts, dissension began to grow within the orchestra's ranks and 18 unionized players walked out (as did Mr. Fain, himself a musician). That year's audit showed $3,286.08 in revenue, with a surplus of $1,975.17!

The union was suggesting $15 for a concert for a wage, and even volunteered to raise the money itself. Eventually, in 1952, the board agreed and, from that day to this, orchestra players have received pay for their service. Another union demand was filled when the board employed its first full-time conductor, Hungarian-born Frederic Balazs.

Volunteer organizations that support the TSO are the Tucson Symphony Orchestra League through fundraising programs and events including the biennial Art of Music, recruiting volunteers to help the administrative office, creating programs to increase awareness of the TSO and building constituencies among the outlying communities young people, professional groups, service organizations and others; the SaddleBrooke Symphony Guild and FATSO—Friends and Admirers of the TS0, which organize dinner/concert events throughout the season for their members.

In 1958, the first Tucson Symphony Youth Orchestra was formed.

By the mid-1960s, the TSO was recording season audiences of some 13,000 in a six-concert season. In 1967, the orchestra had its first sold out season (six concerts, all singles in the 2,600-seat University of Arizona auditorium). Tickets in those days were $2 to $4 while a season ticket, top seats, was $20. In 1968, the orchestra became a metropolitan orchestra with a budget in excess of $100,000. In 1971, the Symphony had its gala opening featuring guest conductor Arthur Fiedler at its new performance venue, the City's Music Hall.

1972 – present
As the Symphony continued to grow and expand its music offerings, the need for a new home and administrative and practice space became apparent. After a major fundraising campaign, the TSO acquired its own building that today houses administration as well as areas for practice, auditions and small performances.

Currently the TSO performs at the following venues: Tucson Music Hall, Catalina Foothills High School, Tucson Symphony Center and Desert Hills Lutheran Church in Green Valley. Additional performances take place at some of Tucson's best restaurants as part of the Moveable Musical Feasts, four evenings of fine music and dining which take place every season.

In 2003, the TSO Chorus made its debut under the direction of Bruce Chamberlain when they performed Handel's Messiah, a MasterWorks Chamber Orchestra special. The 90-voice TSO Chorus has continued to perform Messiah each season in addition to other works. In the 2007/08 79th season, the TSO Chorus will perform at two concerts in the Classic Series and a TSO Pops! concert in addition to the Messiah.

In more than 78 years of existence, the Tucson Symphony Orchestra has grown from a volunteer community orchestra to a fully professional orchestra serving Southern Arizona. In the last 20 years, growth has been apparent through the innovative programming, children's concerts, community concerts throughout Southern Arizona, expansion of repertoire and ever-increasing artistic achievement.

There are over 375 education and community partnership presentations provided by the TSO annually, which reach tens of thousands of children and adults throughout southern Arizona. The Tucson Symphony Orchestra provides the most in-depth music education programs for children in all of Arizona. These include in-school sessions by TSO musicians, concert performances and comprehensive curriculum, as well as the annual Young Artists Competition and Young Composers Project.

In October 2008, they released the first ever commercial project on CD: Concerto no.4 from André Mathieu (1929–1968) a Québécois pianist and composer with Alain Lefèvre on piano.

Mission
The mission of the Tucson Symphony Orchestra is to share beautiful, professionally performed music with as wide an audience as possible. It does so each season through a series of nine Classic concerts, four MasterWorks Chamber Orchestra concerts, five TSO Pops! concerts, Classic, MasterWorks and TSO Pops! Specials, ensemble performances, Moveable Musical Feasts and award-winning educational programs.

Music Directors
The Orchestra has played under the leadership of the following music directors:

See also
Compositions by Bill McGlaughlin
Bill McGlaughlin

External links
Official website

Musical groups established in 1928
Musical groups from Tucson, Arizona
American orchestras
Performing arts in Arizona
1928 establishments in Arizona